Larry William King (born January 30, 1945) is an American sports promoter, and the ex-husband of former World No. 1 professional tennis player Billie Jean King.

Early life and education
King was born in Dayton, Ohio, and raised in Eagle Rock, California. He met Billie Jean Moffitt at California State University, Los Angeles in 1963, when he played on one of the school’s best men's tennis teams, coached by Scotty Deeds. He married Billie Jean on September 17, 1965 in Long Beach, California.

Career
In 1971, King conceived the idea of a professional tennis tour for women and helped organize a group of nine (the Original Nine) top women players: Billie Jean King, Rosie Casals, Judy Dalton, Julie Heldman, Kerry Melville, Peaches Bartkowicz, Kristy Pigeon, Nancy Richey, and Valerie Ziegenfuss. He obtained the backing of Gladys Heldman of World Tennis Magazine and Joe Cullman, CEO of Philip Morris, and the Virginia Slims pro circuit was started.  In 1973, along with Dennis Murphy, Jordan Kaiser and Fred Barman, King developed the concept of World Team Tennis, and started the league the following year. In 1974, King and Billie Jean co-founded and began publishing womenSports magazine.  

In 1976, King invented a smokeless ashtray, called The Clean Air King. In 1984, Billie Jean became the major owner of World Team Tennis. 

King and Denis Murphy also founded Roller Hockey International, a professional hockey league that operated from 1993 to 1999. Murphy had also been instrumental in the founding of the American Basketball Association and the World Hockey Association.

King, a Master Duplicate bridge player and a Director, founded the Prize Money Bridge tour.  He also founded Bridge University to promote bridge throughout the country.

Marriage and personal life 
King had a big impact on the rise of his wife’s fame. Billie Jean was not always a feminist icon; in the 60s he had helped her start to think about the lack of scholarships for sports for women. He never tried to tear down Billie Jean’s aspirations of becoming a tennis superstar and promoted her success continuously. 

In 1971, Billie Jean had an abortion that was made public in a Ms. magazine article. Larry had revealed Billie Jean's abortion without consulting her.

In 1973, Billy Jean defeated Bobby Riggs in a well-publicized match. In 2017, the film Battle of the Sexes was released. In the film, King was shown as becoming aware, that year, of Billie Jean's infidelity with another woman, and decided to ignore it; King said that was false.

Billie Jean was sexually involved with her former secretary, Marilyn Barnett, during Larry and Billie Jean's marriage. In 1981, Billie Jean admitted publicly that the relationship had taken place, in response to a lawsuit by Barnett that asked for palimony. 

Larry and Billie Jean divorced in 1987.

King lives in Grass Valley, California, with his wife, Nancy, and two children, Sky and Katie.  According to the movie Battle of the Sexes, Billie Jean King and her partner Ilana Kloss are godparents to the Kings' children.

References

1945 births
Living people
World TeamTennis
California State University, Los Angeles alumni
American lawyers
Sportspeople from Los Angeles
Sportspeople from Dayton, Ohio
People from Grass Valley, California
Tennis people from California